TMEM69, also known as Transmembrane protein 69, is a protein that in humans is encoded by the TMEM69 gene. A notable feature of the protein encoded by TMEM69 is the presence of five transmembrane segments.

Background Information

Gene
The TMEM69 gene, located on chromosome 1p34.1, covers 7.24 kb. It is on the plus strand in the genomic sequence from 46152886 to 46160121 and encodes a primary mRNA transcript that contains 3 exons and is 6262 bp in length. Three alternative transcripts are predicted to encode the TMEM69 gene.

Gene Neighborhood

Function
The exact function of TMEM69 is not yet understood by the scientific community. It is, however, thought to play a role as a scaffolding protein in a G-coupled protein receptor complex in Xenopus tropicalis. It has been shown to form a cluster with the xtGPR54-2 gene IPP, and GPBP1 in scaffold_41. This complex is part of a G-coupled protein receptor which acts as the receptor for a binding ligand, kisspeptin in the plasma membrane of brain cells.

Protein
TMEM69 is 247 amino acids in length. Five transmembrane segments are present as well as a domain of unknown function, DUF3429, which spans amino acids 91-232.

Predicted Features
Properties of TMEM69 that were predicted using Bioinformatics tools:
 Molecular Weight: 27.6 KDa.
 Isoelectric Point: 10.3
Post-translational modification: Multiple phosphorylation sites are predicted from the NetPhos program on ExPASy . NetPhos predicted 7 for the amino acid serine at position 12, 27, 33, 85, 93, 183, and 234; 1 for threonine at position 26; and 2 for tyrosine at position 57 and 159.  NetGlyc on ExPASy predicted 5 glycation sites at positions 7, 60, 73, 156, and 239.
 Transmembrane Segments: TMEM69 contains 5 transmembrane regions occurring at positions 97-117, 122-142, 159-179, 185-205, and 216-236.

Expression
TMEM69 is expressed ubiquitously at low levels throughout the human body, although EST Profile data reveal that TMEM69 is expressed particularly high in neuroendocrine tissues such as the liver, amygdala, hippocampus, and hypothalamus. TMEM69 was found to be expressed in lower than normal values in patients suffering from atherosclerosis.

Homology

Orthologs
The TMEM69 gene is deeply conserved in several life forms. Although it shows highest conservation among mammalian orthologs, along with other chordates such as fish, birds, and amphibians, there is some conservation in plants, insects, fungi, and bacteria.

Paralogs
No paralogs were found for TMEM69.

Conservation
TMEM69 is well conserved in a variety of organisms. Although most orthologs are found in placental mammals, some orthologs are found in bacteria and fungi. The most distant ortholog found to have sequence similarity with TMEM69 is Pseudomonas putida W619, which is a type of soil bacterium. Particularly well conserved in even the most distant orthologs, including Pseudomonas putida W619, is most of the second transmembrane segment of TMEM69. In strict orthologs, all five transmembrane domains are conserved. Conserved domains found within TMEM69 are part of DUF3429, which is a family of uncharacterized proteins found in bacteria and eukaryotes.

References